Gol Linhas Aéreas Inteligentes S.A ("Gol Intelligent Airlines S.A." also known as VRG Linhas Aéreas S/A) is a Brazilian low-cost airline based in Rio de Janeiro, Brazil. According to the National Civil Aviation Agency of Brazil (ANAC), between January and December 2019 Gol had 37.7% of the domestic and 3.8% of the international market shares in terms of passengers per kilometer flown, making it the largest domestic and third largest international airline in Brazil.

Gol competes in Brazil and other South American countries primarily with LATAM Brasil, and Azul. It also owns the brand Varig, although now that name refers to what is informally known as the "new" Varig, founded in 2006, not to the extinct "old" Varig airline, founded in 1927.

Gol operates a growing domestic and international scheduled network. Its main hubs are São Paulo–Guarulhos International Airport, Rio de Janeiro–Galeão International Airport and Tancredo Neves International Airport near Belo Horizonte. Gol also has focus operations at Rio de Janeiro-Santos Dumont Airport, São Paulo-Congonhas Airport, Salgado Filho International Airport in Porto Alegre. Gol refers to itself as GOL Intelligent Airlines (GOL Linhas Aéreas Inteligentes in Portuguese) as a slogan. The company is traded on the New York Stock Exchange as "GOL Linhas Aéreas Inteligentes S.A.".

The company's name is a Brazilian Portuguese word borrowing from the English word "goal" from Association football. The company slogan is Nova Gol. Novos tempos no ar. ; New Gol, New times on air. .

Celso Ferrer became the CEO of the Brazilian airline 1 July 2022.

History

The airline was established in 2000 and started operations on January 15, 2001 with a flight from Brasília to São Paulo. It is a subsidiary of the Brazilian conglomerate Grupo Áurea, based in Minas Gerais state, which has other transportation interests, including Brazil's largest long-distance bus company. Grupo Áurea in turn is owned by the Constantino family. Constantino Júnior was responsible for building the business next to the vice president of the company, David Barioni.

In 2007, Gol was owned by AeroPar Participações (75.5%), Venture (17.6%), American International Group (5.4%) and Air France-KLM (1.5%).  The growth in GOL's stock price made the Constantino family a member of the Forbes magazine billionaire list in 2005.

In 2007, Gol was supposed to begin a code-share agreement with TAP Portugal, opening the European market to the Brazilian airline, and the internal Brazilian market to the Portuguese airline (the largest foreign airline in Brazil). Instead, TAP Portugal chose to cooperate with TAM Airlines.

On February 24, 2010 Gol announced it was in "advanced talks" to join the Oneworld alliance, which would allow it to catch up with rival TAM, a recent member of Star Alliance. However, on October 6, 2010, the airline announced a change in position by denying any interest in joining an alliance, preferring to remain independent and to establish a "patchwork of code-sharing agreements.". Following this trend, on September 28, 2011 Gol and Aerolíneas Argentinas announced the intention to implement a codeshare, feeder and frequent flyer programs agreement on a date yet to be announced and pending approval from the governments of Brazil and Argentina.

On March 18, 2010 Gol unveiled the expansion of its maintenance base located at Belo Horizonte/Confins - Tancredo Neves International Airport. Originally opened in 2006 with the capacity to service 60 aircraft per year (mainly Boeing 737 and 767), the expansion allowed Gol to increase the number to 120. Gol later started also using the base to service aircraft from other airlines, and as of 2013 it also serviced airplanes from Azul Brazilian Airlines and Copa Airlines.

On December 23, 2010, Gol Airlines started an operational partnership with Brazilian carrier Passaredo Linhas Aéreas. The agreement was rescinded on July 31, 2014, when Passaredo established a similar interline agreement with TAM Airlines instead.

On December 7, 2011, Gol announced the intention of Delta Air Lines to purchase 3% of its shares. The agreement also includes the creation of mutual code-share flights, alignment of frequent flyer benefits and transfer of GOL's Boeing 767s lease agreements to Delta.

On October 1, 2012, Gol confirmed a firm order of 60 Boeing 737 MAXs. References did not specify the type of MAX aircraft.

On October 6, 2012, Gol started seasonal operations to Miami and Orlando, available for Smiles account holders and originating in Brazil only. Technically, they are considered charter flights, although they are not necessarily part of an inclusive tour package; the use of miles or miles plus money is mandatory, as well as a minimum 7-day stay at the destination.

In February 2014, Air France–KLM announced it would invest $100 million in Gol Linhas Aéreas Inteligentes in advance of the 2014 FIFA World Cup and the 2016 Olympics.

Some disagreement exists as to whether Gol is a low-cost carrier. In 2014, Gol was ranked the second best low-cost airline in South America after Azul. Gol refers to itself as a low-cost carrier, but it is increasingly not regarded as such. According to UFRJ specialist Elton Fernandes, "GOL's costs are not very different from those of TAM Airlines. People are accustomed to calling Gol low-cost, but Gol is not that. It is not even low-fare anymore.".

On 26 September 2019, Delta announced that it will exit its minority stake in GOL, following Delta acquiring 20% stake of LATAM Airlines Group.

In March 2023, Gol reduce frequencies in Fortaleza as well as cancelled the Fortaleza airline's hub.

Purchase of Varig

On March 28, 2007 Gol officially purchased part of the assets of VARIG - VRG Linhas Aéreas, informally known as the "new Varig," a new company that owned the Varig brand, for US$320 million from Volo Group and MatlinPatterson Global Opportunities hedge fund. At that time, the "old Varig" was under bankruptcy protection. Gol Linhas Aereas Inteligentes SA posted a first quarter loss of 3.5 million Reais (2 million US dollars) after revenues of 1.6 billion Reais (one billion US dollars).

Gol announced that the Varig brand would continue doing business operating as such, rather than its official name VRG Linhas Aéreas. The transaction, via its GTI subsidiary, required a US$98 million cash payment, with the balance through the allocation of non-voting shares to VARIG Logística and Volo, which had acquired VARIG in June 2006 for US$24 million. The transaction did not involve the original airline, informally known as "old Varig," which continued to exist until its own bankruptcy in mid-2010 under the name Flex Linhas Aéreas.

In 2009 Gol was merged into VRG Linhas Aéreas. VRG Linhas Aéreas thus became an airline that operates two brands: Gol and Varig, although in reality flights are operated only under Gol flight numbers. Initially, the Varig brand operated to medium-haul scheduled and charter international destinations within South America and to the Caribbean with Boeing 737-700's configured in two classes, and to long-haul charter international destinations in North America, Europe and Africa with Boeing 767-300ERs configured in economy only. The latter were also used in wet-lease operations. This scheme was later dropped. The brand Gol operates most of the flights of the network, and had aircraft configured in all-economy class, used for scheduled domestic and international operations within South America.

Because of contractual obligations, between 2006 and 2009 the "new Varig" (VRG Linhas Aéreas) was obliged to purchase a minimum of 140 hours/month of services from the "old Varig" (Flex Linhas Aéreas). Therefore, at that time, some of VRG Linhas Aéreas flights operated with Gol flight numbers but were actually flown with chartered aircraft from Flex Linhas Aéreas. The agreement ceased before the bankruptcy of Flex on August 20, 2010.

Purchase of Webjet Linhas Aéreas
On July 9, 2011, VRG Linhas Aéreas, owner of the brands Gol and Varig, announced the intention to purchase full control of WebJet Linhas Aéreas. The purchase contract was signed on August 2, 2011. On October 10, 2012 the purchase received its final approval with some operational restrictions from the Brazilian regulatory agency. Services were integrated but both companies continued to operate independently for some weeks. Integration started on October 17, 2012 when sales requested via Webjet's web-portal started to be redirected to GOL's site. However, on November 23, 2012 Webjet abruptly ceased to operate and all services were incorporated by GOL. The Webjet brand ceased to exist.  Gol also announced its intention to return all of Webjet's Boeing 737-300s to lessors until the end of the first quarter of 2013. There was no mention to the fate of Webjet's 737-800s.

Partnership with TwoFlex
On April 12, 2019, Gol announced an adapted Essential Air Service partnership with TwoFlex in which the latter would operate feeder services on behalf of Gol in the States of Amazonas, Pará and Mato Grosso using the Cessna 208 Caravan. The flights are marketed by Gol in its reservation platform but operated by TwoFlex and integrated into the network of Gol. This partnership greatly increased the number of Gol destinations in these three States. However, on 14 January 2020 Azul Brazilian Airlines signed an agreement to purchase Twoflex. On March 27, 2020 the Brazilian regulatory bodies gave the nihil obstat to the purchase and sale of flights started on April 14, 2020. thus ending the partnership.

Purchase of MAP Linhas Aéreas

On June 8, 2021 Gol Linhas Aéreas announced the purchase of MAP Linhas Aéreas from Voepass Linhas Aéreas. The transaction included 26 slots at São Paulo–Congonhas Airport belonging to MAP and Voepass. MAP's Amazonian operations and much of its fleet would be transferred to Voepass.

Destinations

Codeshare agreements
Gol has codeshare agreements with the following airlines:

 Aerolíneas Argentinas
 Aeroméxico
 Air France
 American Airlines
 Avianca
 Copa Airlines
 KLM
 Voepass Linhas Aéreas
 Turkish Airlines

Fleet

Current fleet

, Gol operates an all-Boeing 737 fleet, consisting of the following aircraft:

Former fleet
Gol formerly operated the following aircraft:

Airline Affinity Program
Smiles is GOL/Varig's Frequent-flyer program since July 20, 2006. Points can be used for services from GOL/Varig, and partners Aerolíneas Argentinas, Aeromexico, Air Canada, Air Europa, Air France, Alitalia, American Airlines, Avianca, British Airways, Copa Airlines, Emirates, Etihad, Iberia, KLM, Qatar Airways and TAP Air Portugal, including flights, upgrades, holidays, hotel stays and car rentals. Smiles was part of the "new Varig" package bought by GOL, which honored all miles and eventually became its own frequent-flyer program. Previously Gol had no such program.

On a study conducted in 2011, Smiles ranked third among 24 chosen frequent flyer programs, with 97.1% success of requests made.

In 2013, Smiles was spun off as an independent company eventually leading to its IPO at BOVESPA in April 2013.

Accidents and incidents
 On September 29, 2006, Flight 1907, operated by a Boeing 737-800 SFP (Short Field Performance) registered as PR-GTD, disappeared from radar while flying over the central-western state of Mato Grosso en route from Manaus to Brasília and Rio de Janeiro-Galeão. The Gol aircraft broke up in mid-air and crashed in the Amazon jungle, leaving no survivors among its 154 occupants. The wreckage was found a day later. The Legacy jet landed safely at Cachimbo Airport, part of the Brigadeiro Velloso Test Range of the Brazilian Air Force, with damage to the tail and left winglet. As of 2021, Flight 1907 is the only fatal accident in the airline's history.
 On April 29, 2022, a Gol Linhas Aéreas Boeing 737 registered as PR-GUO collided with an Azul Brazilian Airlines Embraer E195 while taxiing at Viracopos International Airport after landing from Santos Dumont Airport. Nobody was injured, with damage only caused to the 737's left winglet and the E195's tailcone.

See also
 List of airlines of Brazil

References

External links

 Gol website
 Gol mobile website
 GOLLOG - (Cargo service)
 Gol History sketch at Aviação Brasil
 "new" Varig History sketch at Aviação Brasil

 
Companies based in Rio de Janeiro (city)
Companies based in São Paulo
Companies listed on B3 (stock exchange)
Companies listed on the New York Stock Exchange
Airlines established in 2000
Latin American and Caribbean Air Transport Association
Low-cost carriers
Brazilian brands
Airlines of Brazil